Mikhail Khvostov has served as the ambassador of Belarus to the United States since May 23, 2003. He is also accredited as a nonresident ambassador to Mexico.

From 1991 to 1992, Khvostov was first secretary at the Belarusian mission to the United Nations, and from 1992 to 1993 was first secretary at the Belarusian embassy to the United States. He was ambassador to Canada from 1997 to 2000, and was then adviser to Belarusian President Alexander Lukashenko, as well as Deputy Prime Minister and Foreign Minister.

Ambassador Khvostov previously served in Washington from 1992 to 1993 as first secretary at the Embassy of Belarus, as well as first secretary at the Belarus Permanent Mission to the United Nations in New York (1991-92). More recently, Ambassador Khvostov served as ambassador to Canada (1997-2000) before becoming an adviser to the president of Belarus, deputy prime minister and minister of foreign affairs (2000-03). Ambassador Khvostov also served as his nation’s deputy minister of foreign affairs (1994-97) and as director of the State Protocol Department and the Legal and Treaties Department of the Ministry of Foreign Affairs (1993-94), in addition to holding various posts within the ministry from 1982 to 1991.

Additionally, Khostov is a member of the Netherlands-based Permanent Court of Arbitration.

Khostov is a graduate of the Minsk State Linguistic University and the Belarusian State University, and is a married father of two.

References
 The Washington Diplomat Newspaper - Ambassador profile 
 Belarus Offers to Become 'Link' in Talks between Non-Aligned Movement and CIS Countries, from Pravda.ru
 Ambassador from Belarus to give BYU lecture March 18
 Who is who in Belarus

1949 births
Living people
People from Pastavy District
Ambassadors of Belarus to Mexico
Ambassadors of Belarus to Canada
Ambassadors of Belarus to the United States
Foreign ministers of Belarus
Belarusian State University alumni
Members of the Permanent Court of Arbitration
Belarusian judges of international courts and tribunals